Peter Crawley (born 5 December 1799, Newington Green, London – 12 March 1865, West Smithfield, London) was an English bare-knuckle boxer. He won the Championship of England in 1827.

Fights

1815
Pat Flannagan - WIN

1816-1817
Bill Hunt - WIN
Jack Bennett - WIN
Tom Price - WIN
Bill Coleman - WIN
"Clara Market John" - WIN
Harry Buckstone - WIN
Tom McCarthy - WIN
Tom Tyler - WIN
Shirley's Carman - WIN
Big Drayman - WIN

1818
11 February - Tom Watson - DRAW
7 August - Ben Sutcliffe - WIN

1819
16 March - Tom Hickman - LOSE

1822
7 May - "Southern's Bully" - WIN

1823
5 May - Dick Acton - WIN
Crawley defeated some more minor opponents

1825
Crawley was unsuccessful to find a backed to fight with Jem Ward for the championship of England

1826
"Unknown Englander" - WIN (private fight)

1827
2 January - Jem Ward - WIN - Crawley becomes Champion of England
4 January - Crawley retires from the ring and refused to meet Jem Ward in another Championship fight

References

External links
Peter Crawley at Cyber Boxing Zone

1799 births
1865 deaths
Boxers from Greater London
People from the London Borough of Hackney
English male boxers
Heavyweight boxers